Events in the year 2003 in the Republic of India.

Incumbents
  President of India – A. P. J. Abdul Kalam 
  Prime Minister of India – Atal Bihari Vajpayee
 Vice President of India – Bhairon Singh Shekhawat
 Chief Justice of India – V. N. Khare

Governors
 Andhra Pradesh – C. Rangarajan (until 3 January), Surjit Singh Barnala (starting 3 January)
 Arunachal Pradesh – Arvind Dave (until 12 June), V. C. Pande (starting 12 June)
 Assam – 
 until 21 April: Srinivas Kumar Sinha
 21 April-5 June: Arvind Dave 
 starting 5 June: Ajai Singh
 Bihar – V. C. Pande (until 12 June), M R Jois (starting 12 June)
 Chhattisgarh – D. N. Sahay (until 1 June), Krishna Mohan Seth (starting 2 June)
 Goa – Kidar Nath Sahani 
 Gujarat – Sunder Singh Bhandari (until 7 May), Kailashpati Mishra (starting 7 May)
 Haryana – Babu Parmanand 
 Himachal Pradesh – Suraj Bhan (until 7 May), Vishnu Sadashiv Kokje (starting 8 May)
 Jharkhand – M. Rama Jois (until 11 June), Ved Marwah (starting 11 June)
 Jammu and Kashmir – Girish Chandra Saxena (until 4 June), S. K. Sinha (starting 4 June)
 Karnataka – T. N. Chaturvedi
 Kerala – Sikander Bakht (starting 18 April)
 Madhya Pradesh – Bhai Mahavir (until 6 May), Ram Prakash Gupta (starting 6 May)
 Maharashtra – Mohammed Fazal 
 Manipur – Ved Marwah (until 12 June), Arvind Dave (starting 12 June)
 Meghalaya – M.M. Jacob 
 Mizoram – Amolak Rattan Kohli 
 Nagaland – Shyamal Datta 
 Odisha – M. M. Rajendran 
 Punjab – J. F. R. Jacob (until 8 May), Om Prakash Verma (starting 8 May)
 Rajasthan – 
 until 14 May: Anshuman Singh  
 14 May-22 September: Nirmal Chandra Jain 
 starting 22 September: Kailashpati Mishra 
 Sikkim – V. Rama Rao 
 Tamil Nadu – P. S. Ramamohan Rao 
 Tripura – Krishna Mohan Seth (until 31 May), Dinesh Nandan Sahay (starting 1 June)
 Uttar Pradesh – Vishnu Kant Shastri 
 Uttarakhand – Surjit Singh Barnala (until 7 January), Sudarshan Agarwal (starting 7 January)
 West Bengal – Viren J. Shah

Events
 National income - 27,925,301 million
26 January – The president of Iran, Mohammad Khatami, is the guest at the Republic Day celebration.
5–9 February – Aero-India show is held in Bangalore.
March – India put up a great show at the ICC Cricket World Cup in South Africa after poor performances in the past and go on to the Finals. They were defeated by Australia in the Finals.
23 March - 
Abdul Majeed Dar, former Kashmiri Militants who initiated peace talks shot dead by assailants at Sopore.
2003 Nadimarg massacre
18 April – Prime Minister Atal Bihari Vajpayee, at his first rally in Srinagar, makes a historic announcement of a peace initiative with Pakistan.
31 May – Prime Minister Vajpayee has the rare honour of joining the head table at the 300th foundation day of St. Petersburg with Vladimir Putin and George W. Bush.
22 June – Vajpayee is in China. India concedes that Tibet is an integral part of China. China agrees to recognise Sikkim's accession to India.
14 July – India refuses to send troops to Iraq.
25 August – 52 killed in two bomb blasts in Mumbai.
24 September – United States President George W. Bush invites Vajpayee to lunch in New York City during Vajpayee's US trip. It is considered an important meeting for Indo-US relations. Several deals are struck on civilian nuclear technology, space, hi-tech trade and missile defence.
6 October – Vajpayee visits Bali for the second time in 2 years.
22 October – India announces confidence-building measures with respect to Indo-Pakistani relations: more buses, flights, higher mission strength, etc.
15 November – Vajpayee visits Syria.
28 November – Abu Salem, one of India's most wanted fugitives for his alleged role in the 1993 Bombay bombings, is sentenced to four and a half years imprisonment by a Portuguese court on charges of fraud and resisting arrest. In response, the Central Bureau of Investigation announces it will maintain its efforts to seek Salem's deportation to India.

Births 

 22 January – Shruti Bisht, actress
 15 April – Pranavi Urs, golfer

Deaths
8 January – Mahadeva Subramania Mani, entomologist (born 1908).
14 July – Leela Chitnis, actress (born 1909).
1 February  Kalpana Chawla, Indian-American Astronaut and first Indian woman to go to space (born 1962). 
27 July – Henning Holck-Larsen, engineer, co-founder of Larsen & Toubro (born 1907).
25 October – Pandurang Shastri Athavale, philosopher, spiritual leader, social reformer, who founded the Swadhyay Movement (born 1920).
3 November – Narendra Prasad, actor, playwright, teacher and literary critic (born 1946).
9 November – Binod Bihari Verma, writer (born 1937).
21 December – G. V. Iyer, film director (born 1917).

See also 

 List of Bollywood films of 2003

References

 
Years of the 21st century in India
2000s in India
India
India